Resurrection is a 1931 American Pre-Code English-language adaptation of the 1899 Leo Tolstoy novel Resurrection produced by Universal Studios. It was an all-talking version starring John Boles and Lupe Vélez.

It was directed by Edwin Carewe, who had also directed the previous 1927 silent adaptation. A Spanish language version, Resurrección was also made in the same year by Universal Studios.  The film starred John Boles as well as Lupe Vélez, who also starred in the Spanish-language version.

Cast

English version
The cast list is as follows:

 John Boles as Prince Dmitri Nekhludoff
 Lupe Vélez as Katyusha Maslova
 Rose Tapley as Princess Sophya
 Nance O'Neil as Princess Marya
 William Keighley as Captain Schoenbock
 Michael Mark as Simon Kartinkin – Innkeeper
 Sylvia Nadina as Simon's Wife
 George Irving as Judge
 Edward Cecil as Smelkoff the Merchant
 Mary Forman as Beautiful Exile
 Grace Cunard as Olga
 Dorothy Flood as Princess Hasan

References

External links
 

1931 films
Films based on Resurrection
American black-and-white films
Films directed by Edwin Carewe
1931 drama films
American drama films
American multilingual films
Films set in Russia
1931 multilingual films
1930s American films